Cassidy is a 1917 American silent drama film directed by Arthur Rosson and starring Richard Rosson, Frank Currier and Pauline Curley.

Cast
 Richard Rosson as Cassidy 
 Frank Currier as Dist. Atty. Grant
 Pauline Curley as Grant's Daughter
 Mac Alexander as Garvice
 Eddie Sturgis as The Bull
 John O'Connor as The Bartender

References

Bibliography
 Robert B. Connelly. The Silents: Silent Feature Films, 1910-36, Volume 40, Issue 2. December Press, 1998.

External links
 

1917 films
1917 drama films
1910s English-language films
American silent feature films
Silent American drama films
American black-and-white films
Triangle Film Corporation films
Films directed by Arthur Rosson
1910s American films